Screen Hero (foaled 18 April 2004) is a Japanese Thoroughbred racehorse and sire best known for winning the 2008 Japan Cup. In his first two seasons he showed above-average racing ability, winning two races and being placed at Grade II level but appeared to be some way behind the best horses in Japan. After a lengthy absence he emerged as a top-class racehorse as a four-year-old in 2008, winning the Grade II Copa Republica Argentina before recording a 40/1 upset victory in the Japan Cup. He failed to win in the following year and his racing career was ended by a serious leg injury at the end of the season. He has had early success as a breeding stallion.

Background
Screen Hero is a chestnut horse with a white star and two white socks standing 15.3½ hands high, bred by the Yoshida family's Shadai Farm. He is one of the best horses sired by the Kentucky-bred stallion Grass Wonder whose wins included the Asahi Hai Futurity Stakes, the Takarazuka Kinen and two runnings of the Arima Kinen. Screen Hero's dam Running Heroine (a daughter of Sunday Silence) finished unplaced in both of her races in 1996. Running Heroine's dam Dyna Actress was a top-class racemare who won the Sprinters Stakes and was the JRA Award for Best Older Filly or Mare in 1987 and 1988. She was descended from the influential French-bred broodmare La Troienne.

During his racing career Screen Hero was owned by Teruya Yoshida and was initially trained by Susumu Yano.

Racing career

2006 & 2007: early career
As a juvenile, Screen Hero ran twice on the dirt in maiden races, finishing fourth over 1600 metres at Tokyo Racecourse and second over 1800 metres at Nakayama Racecourse.

Screen Hero raced eleven times and won two races as a three-year-old in 2007. On his seasonal debut he recorded his first victory when he won a maiden over 1800 metres on dirt at Nakayama in January, beating Berg Missile and fourteen others. In February he finished third at Tokyo and then won a minor race over 1600 metres at Nakayama. In March he was switched to turf and moved up in class for the Grade II Fuji TV Spring Stakes and finished fifth behind Flying Apple before competing on dirt for the last time and finishing second over 1800 metres at Nakyama. After being beaten in two races on turf at Tokyo he was moved back into Grade III class for the Radio Nikkei Sho at Fukushima Racecourse on 1 July and produced his best effort to date as he finished second of the sixteen runners behind the New Zealand-bred Roc de Cambes. In his two remaining races of 2007 he ran unplaced in the Grade III Niigata Kinen and finished third to Roc de Cambes in the Grade II St Lite Kinen over 2200 metres at Nakayama on 16 September. His performances had earned him a place in the Kikuka Sho in October but his season was ended by a fracture to his left foreleg.

2008: four-year-old season

After a break of eleven months, Screen Hero returned in the Shikotsuko Tokubetsu over 2600 metres at Sapporo Racecourse on 16 August 2008 and recorded his best win up to that time as he defeated B B Falcon and nine others. In his next two races he finished second to Biennale over 2600 metres at Sapporo in September and was then beaten a nose by Jaguar Mail in the October Stakes over 2400 metres at Tokyo.

By late autumn, Susumu Yano had retired and Screen Hero entered the stable of the first-season trainer Yuichi Shikato. On 9 November he was ridden by Masayoshi Ebina when he contested the Copa Republica Argentina, a Grade II handicap race over 2500 metres at Tokyo. The colt recorded his first win at Graded level as he came home one and a half lengths clear of Jaguar Mail with Al Nasrain a neck away in third.

On 30 November Screen Hero contested the 28th running of the Japan Cup in front of a 102,567 crowd at Tokyo and started a 40/1 outsider in a seventeen-runner field. Before the race Shikato commented "He's getting better with each race. He knows how to race, so I'm not particularly concerned about the draw. We're challengers here". The Tokyo Yushun winner Deep Sky started favourite ahead of the outstanding racemare Vodka. The overseas challenge was provided by the three British runners Papal Bull (King Edward VII Stakes, Princess of Wales's Stakes), Sixties Icon (St Leger) and Purple Moon (Ebor Handicap, runner-up in the Melbourne Cup). The other Japanese runners included Meisho Samson (Satsuki Sho, Tokyo Yushun, Tenno Sho), Oken Bruce Lee (Kikuka Sho), Asakusa Kings (Kikuka Sho) and Matsurida Gogh (Arima Kinen). Ridden by the Italian jockey Mirco Demuro Screen Hero tracked the leaders as the outsider Never Bouchon set a slow pace. Matsurida Gogh took the lead in the straight but Screen Hero produced a powerful late run to take the lead 150 metres from the post. In a blanket finish he won by half a length, three quarters of a length, a head and a neck from Deep Sky, Vodka, Matsurida Gogh and Oken Bruce Lee. After the race Demuro said "We had decided to mark Matsurida Gogh as he always gets a nice position. The only thing I had been concerned about was the start, but he broke well and the slow pace meant we could move in and get a good position easily... he is a very competitive horse. When he lines up with other horses, he really battles to stay ahead of them". Shikato commented "My heart was just pounding until he was over the finish line... With each race he seemed to rise to meet the level of his opponents".

On his final appearance of the season at Nakayama on 28 December, Screen Hero finished fifth behind the four-year-old filly Daiwa Scarlet in the Arima Kinen.

In January 2009, Screen Hero was voted Champion Japanese older male horse at the JRA Awards, taking 167 of 300 votes.

2009: five-year-old season
Screen Hero remained in training as a five-year-old but failed to win in five races. In the spring he ran fourth behind Asakusa Kings in the Hanshin Daishoten and then finished down the field behind Meiner Kitz in the 3200 metres Tenno Sho. In the Takarazuka Kinen he started a 20/1 outsider and finished fifth, three lengths behind the winner Dream Journey. After a break of over four months he returned in November for the autumn edition of the Tenno Sho for which he started at odds of 30/1 in an eighteen-runner field. Ridden by Hiroshi Kitamura he produced his best effort of the season as he finished second to the eight-year-old Company with Vodka in third and Oken Bruce Lee, Dream Journey, Matsurida Gogh and Asakusa Kings among the unplaced horses. On his final run of the year, he attempted to repeat his 2008 success in the Japan Cup but finished thirteenth of the eighteen runners behind Vodka.

In December it was reported that Screen Hero had sustained a serious leg injury, described as a "bowed tendon" and would not race for at least nine months. In fact he never raced again and was retired to stud in 2010.

Stud record
Screen Hero was retired from racing to become a breeding stallion. For the 2015 season he was based at the Lex Stud. His first two crops of foals included Maurice Gold Actor (Arima Kinen) and the Grade III winners Musee Alien and Guanciale.

Notable progeny

c = colt, f = filly, g = gelding

Pedigree

 Screen Hero is inbred 4 × 4 to Hail To Reason and Northern Dancer, meaning that both of these stallions appear twice in the fourth generation of his pedigree.

References 

2004 racehorse births
Racehorses bred in Japan
Racehorses trained in Japan
Thoroughbred family 1-x
Japan Cup winners